Carpino is a surname in the Italian language.

People with the surname include

 Christie Carpino, American politician
 Francesco Carpino (1905–1993), Italian cardinal
 John Carpino, American baseball executive
 Pasquale Carpino (1936–2005), Italian-Canadian chef

Surnames
Italian-language surnames